Trichoptilus regalis is a moth of the family Pterophoridae. It was described by Thomas Bainbrigge Fletcher in 1909 and is found in Sri Lanka and India.

The larvae have been recorded feeding on Calycopteris floribunda.

References

Moths described in 1909
Moths of Asia
Oxyptilini